Gobiatherium (meaning "Beast of the Gobi Desert") was one of the last Uintatheres, from the Mid Eocene of Mongolia. Unlike its North American cousins, Uintatherium or Eobasileus, Gobiatherium lacked knob-like horns, or even fang-like tusks.  Instead, it had enlarged cheekbones and an almost spherical snout.

Because of the noticeable lack of many diagnostic uintathere features (the horns and tusks), the genus is placed within its own subfamily, "Gobiatheriinae", though some experts prefer to rank it as the family "Gobiatheriidae".

References 
Cheng Jie & Ma Aneheng: New mammalian materials from the Eocene of the Liguanqiao basin. Vertebrata PalAsiatica 28, 1990, S. 228–244.
 McKenna, M.C. & Bell, S.K. Classification of Mammals Above the Species Level. 1997, Columbia University Press, New York. 
Spencer George Lucas: Gobiatherium (Mammalia: Dinocerata) from the Middle Eocene of Asia: Taxonomy and biochronological Significance. Paläontologische Zeitschrift 74 (4), 2001, S. 591–600.

Dinoceratans
Eocene genus extinctions
Fossils of Mongolia
Fossil taxa described in 1932
Prehistoric placental genera